Neustadt (Sachs) is a railway station in the town of Neustadt in Sachsen, Saxony, Germany. The station lies on the Bautzen–Bad Schandau railway and Neustadt–Dürrröhrsdorf railway.

The station is served by DB Regio Südost. This service connects Pirna and Sebnitz via Neustadt.

References

External links
 
Städtebahn Sachsen website
Neustadt station at Sebnitztalbahn 
Neustadt station at www.verkerhsmittelvergleich.de 

Railway stations in Saxony
railway station
Railway stations in Germany opened in 1877